The Men's 100 Freestyle swimming event at the 2009 SEA Games was held on December 11, 2009.

Results

Final

Preliminary heats

References

Swimming at the 2009 Southeast Asian Games